Aurora—Oak Ridges—Richmond Hill is a federal electoral district in Ontario, Canada. It has been represented by Leah Taylor Roy, a Liberal, since 2021.

It encompasses a portion of Ontario previously included in the electoral districts of Newmarket—Aurora, Oak Ridges—Markham, and Richmond Hill.

Aurora—Oak Ridges—Richmond Hill was created by the 2012 federal electoral boundaries redistribution and was legally defined in the 2013 representation order. It came into effect upon the dropping of the writs for the 2015 federal election.

Demographics 
According to the 2021 Canada Census

Ethnic groups: 40.3% White, 28.4% Chinese, 11.0% West Asian, 7.5% South Asian, 2.5% Korean, 2.0% Black, 1.8% Arab, 1.4% Filipino, 1.1% Latin American

Languages: 41.0% English, 12.6% Mandarin, 8.9% Cantonese, 7.7% Persian, 4.0% Russian, 2.4% Italian, 1.9% Korean, 1.3% Arabic, 1.1% Spanish

Religions: 42.3% Christian (20.9% Catholic, 5.7% Christian Orthodox, 1.9% Anglican, 1.6% United Church, 1.1% Presbyterian, 11.1% Other), 11.7% Muslim, 3.7% Jewish, 2.3% Hindu, 1.9% Buddhist, 37.0% None

Median income: $39,600 (2020)

Average income: $63,900 (2020)

Members of Parliament

This riding has elected the following Members of Parliament:

Election results

References

Ontario federal electoral districts
Aurora, Ontario
Politics of Richmond Hill, Ontario
2013 establishments in Ontario